PeoplePC is an Internet service provider owned by EarthLink.

History 
PeoplePC was founded by Nick Grouf, Max Metral and David Waxman, and launched in the United States in October 1999. It bundled personal computers with internet service and access to discounted products and services. Initially funded by SoftBank, the company's mission was to "democratize technology." Its business model included collective buying, which allowed the company to generate additional revenue from advertising, partnerships, and premium products.

In February 2000, the company announced that they would provide PCs and Internet access to all of the employees of Ford Motor Co. and Delta Air Lines. Ford announced a cooperation with PeoplePC shortly after and said they would provide all of their then 350,000 employees with internet access for as little as $5 a month. The deal with Delta led to a total of around 420,000 potential new customers for PeoplePC. The deal with Ford was eventually canceled.

In October it was announced, that PeoplePC would open European subsidiaries to enable overseas corporations and governments to offer their employees low-cost home computers and Internet access and later developed partnerships with Vivendi Universal, The New York Times, Blue Cross Blue Shield, and the National Trades Union of Singapore. PeoplePC donated internet access to low-income families through President Clinton's ClickStart initiative, and provided both computers and computer training to economically disadvantaged students through its PeopleGive program.

PeoplePC debuted on NASDAQ in August 2000 under the ticker PEOP at $10 a share and its stock declined quickly. In 2002 the company was acquired by EarthLink. PeoplePC has been managed by CEO Nick Grouf since 2002.

Products and services 
When the company started, PeoplePC focused on selling three-year memberships to consumers. As part of the membership, customers received a new computer, which was replaced every three years. They were also granted access to the company's buyer's club and were provided with Internet access and a warranty. PeoplePC then focused more on companies and their employees.

Today PeoplePC offers internet services in the main categories internet access, security & tools, and website & marketing. They also provide webmail service to their users without any extra charges.

Recognitions 
In 2006, J.D. Power and Associates ranked PeoplePC Online as the first value-priced dial-up provider to receive the highest ratings from customers in four factors: cost of service, billing, e-mail services, and offerings.

References
18. Peoplepc smtp Settings.

External links
PeoplePC website

Telecommunications companies established in 1999
Internet service providers of the United States
EarthLink
Companies based in Atlanta
2002 mergers and acquisitions